The 1892 Varuna Boat Club of Bay Ridge football team was an American football team that represented the Varuna Boating Club of the Bay Ridge area of Brooklyn, New York during the 1892 college football season.  The Boating Club, which had established a football program in 1886, compiled a 9–3 record against an assortment of semi-professional and collegiate teams.  The final two contests for the Varunas (as the team was otherwise known) were played at Madison Square Garden against the Manhattan and Orange Athletic Clubs.

Schedule

Second team schedule

References

Varuna Boat Club
Varuna Boat Club football seasons
Varuna Boat Club football